Cantagallo may refer to:

 Cantagallo, Bolívar, Colombia
 Cantagallo, Tuscany, Italy
 Cantagallo, Spain, Spain

See also
 Cantagalo (disambiguation)